Taxicab Confessions is a television series of hidden camera documentaries that aired on HBO from 1995 through 2006.

When passengers enter the cab, they are recorded with several small cameras hidden in the taxi. The producer prompts passengers into discussing their past and/or present circumstances. This has led some participants to reflect on their life, recalling extreme tragedies or triumphs. Much is verbally or visually graphic, including explicit sex talk and sex acts performed in the back seat. At the end of the taxi ride, passengers are asked to sign waivers allowing the hidden camera footage to be used on the program, and footage of this revelation is sometimes seen during the closing credits.

Separating the segments are short video montages showing life in the city, incorporating quick cuts of club interiors, flashing neon signage, strippers and the homeless, along with the series theme music, "Over the Rainbow" by Me First and the Gimme Gimmes.

The series originated in New York, moved to Las Vegas, and then returned to New York.

Awards and nominations
The first episode won the Primetime Emmy Award for Outstanding Informational Series or Special in 1995. The show was also nominated for the Primetime Emmy Award for Outstanding Non-Fiction Program (Reality) in 2001 and 2002.

See also
 Cash Cab, a game show set in a taxi

References

External links
 
 

1995 American television series debuts
2006 American television series endings
1990s American reality television series
2000s American reality television series
1990s American documentary television series
2000s American documentary television series
Taxis
HBO original programming
American hidden camera television series
English-language television shows
HBO Shows (series) WITHOUT Episode info, list, or Article